Div Sultan Rumlu was a Turkmen military commander and politician from the Rumlu clan, one of the seven chief Qizilbash tribes which provided crack troops for Safavid guard. In 1516-1527, he served as the governor (hakem) of the Erivan Province (also known as Chokhur-e Sa'd). From 1524 to 1527, he was a powerful regent to Shah Tahmasp I, who was then underage. Div Sultan Rumlu had summer quarters at Lar Valley in the Alborz Mountains. He was killed in a power struggle in 1527.

References

Sources
 

Safavid generals
Safavid governors of Erivan
Year of birth missing
1527 deaths
Field marshals of Iran
Rumlu
Vakils of Safavid Iran
Iranian Turkmen people
Commanders-in-chief of Safavid Iran
16th-century people of Safavid Iran